Gaius Scribonius Curio may refer to:
 Gaius Scribonius Curio (consul)
 Gaius Scribonius Curio (tribune 50 BC)
 Gaius Scribonius Curio (son of Fulvia)